Andrii Kobchyk (born March 9, 1994) is a Ukrainian male acrobatic gymnast. Along with his partner, Vladyslav Bobryshev, he finished 6th in the 2014 Acrobatic Gymnastics World Championships.

References

1994 births
Living people
Ukrainian acrobatic gymnasts
Male acrobatic gymnasts